Sir Thomas Cockburn-Campbell, 4th Baronet (18 April 1845 – 27 September 1892) was an English-born journalist and politician in Australia.


Early life
Cockburn-Campbell was born in Exeter, the second son of Sir Alexander Thomas Cockburn-Campbell, second Baronet, and his wife, Grace, daughter of Joseph Spence. He was educated in England and at Heidelberg and travelled in Europe.

Cockburn-Campbell left England for Queensland, Australia in 1864 where he worked with Augustus Gregory as a chainman and later with other surveyors. In the late 1860s he went to Western Australia and took up farming; his father was resident magistrate at Albany, Western Australia. In 1871 he succeeded to the baronetcy on the death of his elder brother Alexander Cockburn-Campbell.

Political career
In 1873 Cockburn-Campbell was nominated a member of the old Western Australian Legislative Council and became chairman of committees. He was for some time editor of the West Australian but retired in 1887 due to ill health and was succeeded by John Winthrop Hackett. In 1890 he was appointed one of the delegates sent to London to give information and assistance in connexion with the passing of the Western Australian constitution bill. He also gave evidence before the Colonization Committee of the House of Commons. In December 1890 Campbell became a member of the new Legislative Council and was elected its first president. He died at Perth, Western Australia on 27 September 1892. He had married in 1870 Lucy Anne, daughter of Arthur Trimmer, who survived him with two sons and four daughters.

In 1882, Ferdinand von Mueller named Prostanthera campbellii in his honour.

Music
Sir Thomas composed a waltz "The Fair Maid of Perth" (1890) dedicated to Miss Margaret Brockman (Mrs P.A.Hope), published in London.

Family
Cockburn-Campbell is the great-great-grandfather of National Party MP Merome Beard.

References

O. K. Battye, 'Cockburn-Campbell, Sir Thomas (1845 - 1892)', Australian Dictionary of Biography, Volume 3, MUP, 1969, pp 434–435

1845 births
1892 deaths
Members of the Western Australian Legislative Council
Presidents of the Western Australian Legislative Council
Burials at East Perth Cemeteries
Australian newspaper editors
19th-century journalists
English male journalists
19th-century English male writers
The West Australian
19th-century Australian politicians
Baronets in the Baronetage of the United Kingdom
British emigrants to Australia